Ferujol is a compound in the coumarin family, isolated from Ferula jaeschkeana.

It is reported to have contraceptive activity when given to female rats 1–5 days after coitus.

References 

Terpeno-phenolic compounds
Coumarins
Phenol ethers